Apsilocephala is a genus of flies in the family Apsilocephalidae. There is only one extant described species in Apsilocephala, but there are also two fossil species.

Species
 Apsilocephala longistyla Krober, 1914
 †Apsilocephala pusilla (Hennig, 1967)
 †Apsilocephala vagabunda (Cockerell, 1927)

References

Articles created by Qbugbot
Asiloidea genera